Brus is a four-hand card game of German descent that was once played in Denmark and Estonia. The game is descended from the oldest known card game in Europe, Karnöffel, a fact testified by its unusual card ranking and lack of a uniform trump suit.

Brus is designed for four players and is played with 36 cards of a French pack, each of the four suits comprising the cards 6-10, Jack, Queen, King and Ace.

History 
Brus is described as an old Jutlandish game, but its rules and terminology suggest that it is descended from the centuries-old German game of Brusbart, now known as Bruus, which was once the national game of Hamburg and which spread across most of northern Europe spawning a family of games such as Russian Bruzbart, Polish Drużbart, Swedish Bräus, Greenlandic Voormsi and others. Brusbart in turn is descended from Karnöffel, the oldest card game in Europe with a continuous tradition of play down to the present day, a fact testified to by "the wildly disturbed ranking order in the chosen suit and particularly by the special role of the chosen Seven".

Estonian Brus 
Swedish-speaking peoples used to live on the Estonian islands until 1944 and, in 1855, were recorded by Russwurm as playing Brus. The Sevens are called friare and the aim is to win five tricks, presumably from a total of nine.

Danish Brus 
Much more detail is known of the Danish variant of Brus which was part of West Jutland's rural culture in the first half of the 19th century. For example, it is described as one of two games played around Christmas time by the older folk in Skanderup in the Danish county of Ribe. It was not played for money; instead the score was chalked up, presumably on a slate or the table. The top trumps were the Spidt (Jack of Clubs), Brus (King of Hearts) and Gal Hund (Eight of Spades). The men would play cards all evening while drinking schnapps and beer and reminiscing about the Napoleonic Wars.

The rules of the Danish game are described in various sources from 1853 to 1973. It is a 36-card, 4-player game, with the same matadors as those in the Estonian game. Players received 3 hand cards and played for the best of nine tricks.

There is evidence that the game is still be being taught and played in Denmark. Unsurprisingly, its mechanics are very similar to its German Schleswig cousin, Bruus, played south of the border in German west Jutland.

Rules 

The following rules for Danish Brus are based on Smith's reconstruction of three Danish texts dating to 1853, 1920 and 1952.

Cards 
A 36-card, Danish-pattern pack is used. Cards rank as follows:

  - Spids
  - Brus
  - Galhund or Gale Hund
 Nines
 Aces
 Jacks
 Sixes

The top three cards - Spids, Brus and Galhund - are the matadors. The Sevens have a special role: they are unbeatable when led to a trick, except by a Seven of a higher suit or by the  – the Stodderkonge or Beggar King – otherwise the Sevens are worthless and cannot beat anything. Apart from these circumstances, neither King had any value. This was also true of the remaining cards: the other Kings, the Queens, Tens and Eights (except the Galhund). The worthless cards are 'windmills' and can never win a trick unless all four cards are windmills, in which case the led card wins.

Players 
Four players form two teams of two for the session with partners sitting opposite one another. Three may also play, each playing alone.

Dealing 
Players cut for the deal, lowest card deals first. Three cards are dealt clockwise to each player in one batch, starting with the dealer. The rest are placed face down on the table to form the talon.

Playing 
Forehand (left of dealer) leads to the first trick; the winner of a trick leads to the next. There is no requirement to follow suit, trump or head the trick. Players may always play any card. As in other games in the family, two or three cards of the same rank may be led and all must be beaten to win the double- or triple-trick thus arising. For example, Galhund and two other Eights can only be beaten by Spids or Brus and any two trick cards. When the trick is taken, players replenish their cards in order starting with the trick winner.

Chancing and smacking 
A player with the Galhund or Brus may say "I'll chance it" or "I dare" as the card is played. This is only permitted, however, if a higher matador is still in play and not held by the chancer, if the talon is not exhausted, if another player has yet to play to the trick and if winning the bonus would not result in winning the rubber. The chancer scores a point unless the matador is 'smacked' by a higher card played by an opponent in which case the opposing side score two points. If a card is found to be unlawfully chanced, it is automatically smacked.

Scoring 

In addition to the bonuses for chancing and smacking, the team that wins the most tricks in each deal scores a point. Two points are scored for winning the first 5 tricks i.e. winning 5–0. 

To keep score, players draw a so-called 'comb', a horizontal line with vertical lines drawn across it at right angles. Each team has one half of the comb and points are scored by erasing or striking out the lines on the team's side of the comb. The first side to erase or cross off all its lines wins. Game is usually 9 points.

Ringkøbing variant 
In a variant originally played in Ringkøbing during the 1950s and 1960s, there are the following differences from the above rules:

 The talon is called the bunken
 Fives are retained and the Tens are removed.
 If a 7 is played, an opponent with the  can beat it, saying "I'll hawk it", and score a bonus point.
 A player with 3 cards may take over and lead to the triple trick automatically
 Game is thirteen points. A 5–0 win is called a jan but is still worth 2 points.
 At 12 points, a team may not chance because the winning point has to be for winning a deal. If a team does score a bonus point to reach 13, they receive a penalty point or 'chimney' and now have to score 14.

Footnotes

References

Literature 
 _ (1853). Spillebog for Børn. Copenhagen. 40 pp. Brus described on pp. 21–23. 
 
 
 
 
 
 'Per David' (pseudonym of Sv. Frederiksen) (1920), Reglerne for 52 gamle Spil, Copenhagen. Brus described on pp. 19–24.
 

Danish card games
Karnöffel group
Four-player card games
Three-player card games
19th-century card games